Ryan Mallett (born June 5, 1988) is a former American football quarterback who is currently the head football coach at White Hall High School in White Hall, Arkansas. He played college football at Arkansas, and was drafted by the New England Patriots in the third round of the 2011 NFL Draft. He also played for the Houston Texans and Baltimore Ravens.

High school career
Mallett graduated from Texas High School in Texarkana, Texas, and was ranked as the #2 quarterback and #4 overall player in the nation by Rivals.com. He was also the Gatorade Player of the Year in Texas in 2006. Mallett participated in the U.S. Army All-American Bowl in 2007 and won the Glenn Davis Army Award as the best player on the West team. He chose to play at Michigan over numerous Power 5 offers.

High school statistics

College career

Michigan

2007

Mallett made his first appearance at Michigan in the second game of the 2007 season against Oregon. He entered the game for the injured Chad Henne in the third quarter and completed 6 of 17 passes for 49 yards and one interception. Mallett started the next week against Notre Dame and led the Wolverines to a 38–0 victory by throwing 3 touchdown passes, going 7/15 (46.7%) for 90 yards. Mallett started his first Big Ten conference game against Penn State the following week. He went 16/29 (55.2%) with 170 yards and one interception. He also scored on a 10-yard rush in the first quarter. Henne returned to start the Wolverines' next three games. In those games, Mallett had limited playing time completing 4/10 for 30 yards.

Mallett's next start was against Minnesota. He threw a touchdown pass and went 11/20 (55.0%) with 233 yards and no interceptions. Mallett did not start, but played extensively the next week in a loss against Wisconsin. He threw 3 touchdown passes and went 11/36 (30.6%) with 245 yards and two interceptions. In the fourth quarter, Mallett threw a 97-yard touchdown pass to Mario Manningham, the longest pass completion in Michigan history. Mallett played very little in the next week's game against Ohio State. He threw three passes and completed one of them for eight yards. Overall, he finished the 2007 season with 892 passing yards, seven passing touchdowns, and five interceptions.

Departure from Michigan

Mallett's place at Michigan was in question after new head coach Rich Rodriguez was hired to replace retiring coach Lloyd Carr because of the style of offense Rodriguez ran at West Virginia. Rodriguez chose to overhaul Michigan's offense and installed a "spread" read option offensive scheme, which did not fit Mallett's skills as a drop-back, pocket quarterback. Rodriguez unsuccessfully courted Terrelle Pryor to run Michigan's offense. Mallett and his family maintain he was open to staying at Michigan had Rodriguez been open to utilizing his skill set as a pro style passer.

On January 14, 2008, Mallett enrolled at the University of Arkansas, where he was ineligible to play during the 2008 season due to NCAA transfer policies.

Arkansas

2009
In 2009 as a redshirt sophomore, Mallett began his career as an Arkansas Razorback, under the direction of head coach Bobby Petrino. Prior to the 2009 season, Mallett was named by ESPN's Bruce Feldman as one of college football's top 10 newcomers of the year, citing his arm strength as a major determining factor. In subsequent interviews, when Mallett was questioned about how far he could throw the football, he said farther than 80 yards.

On March 1, 2009, he was arrested on charges of public intoxication. He pleaded guilty to the misdemeanor charge on April 3, 2009 and paid $155 in court costs, fines, and fees. Mallett was also punished by Coach Petrino with early wake-up calls, extra running, and early curfews.

Mallett earned the starting job in the Razorbacks' first game against Missouri State, going 17-of-22 for 309 yards and a touchdown. Two weeks later, Mallett passed for 408 yards and five touchdowns against Georgia in a losing effort. The passing yardage and touchdowns were single-game school records. Ryan threw for more than 250 yards in three of Arkansas' next five games, with nine touchdowns against three interceptions. Impressive victories over Texas A&M and Auburn were coupled with tough losses to Alabama and Ole Miss, and a loss to Florida. After a dismal 3–4 start, Mallett led Arkansas to three consecutive victories over Eastern Michigan (14-of-16 for 248 yards and three touchdowns), South Carolina (23-of-27 for 329 yards and one rushing touchdown), and Troy (23-of-30 for 405 yards, five touchdowns and one interception). Over those three games, he completed 83.1% of his passes, and had a quarterback rating of 165.05, which was third-best in the nation. The victory over Troy pushed Arkansas' record to 6–4 and secured the Hogs' bowl eligibility, with games against Mississippi State and LSU remaining. Mallett went on to throw for 313 yards and matched his career high of five touchdown passes in a 42–21 victory over Mississippi State. The following week, he threw for 227 yards and a touchdown in a 33–30 overtime loss to LSU in Baton Rouge. Ryan was named to the All-SEC 2nd Team squad by the coaches and the AP for his performance during the season, behind Florida QB Tim Tebow despite superior passing statistics. The Razorbacks finished the 2009 season with an 8–5 record and won the 2010 Liberty Bowl against East Carolina, 20–17 in overtime. Mallett was named the bowl game's Offensive MVP.

Mallett currently owns sixteen school records, including most passing yards in a season (3,627), most consecutive passes without an interception, most passing yards in a game (408), most passing touchdowns in a game (5, three times), only quarterback to pass for over 400 yards in a game (two times), most pass plays of 25 or more yards in a season, and most passing touchdowns in a single season (30).

Mallett chose to forgo entering the 2010 NFL Draft, and returned for his junior season at Arkansas. Mallett was considered among the top five quarterbacks if he had entered the draft.

2010

It was announced on February 17 that Mallett had suffered a left foot injury in a change of direction conditioning drill. The junior had successful surgery later that day, and a planned second surgery was announced on June 9. Mallett missed the Razorback spring game and spring drills, but he did not miss fall camp. During the off season, Mallett was named one of college football's most irreplaceable players by ESPN.com, and he appeared on College Football Live. At the SEC's 2010 Media Days conference, Mallett became the first Arkansas quarterback to be named preseason first-team All-SEC by the SEC coaches. He was listed as the frontrunner for the Davey O'Brien Award by The Sporting News and a potential Heisman Trophy candidate. He was also named a preseason All-SEC quarterback and preseason All-American quarterback by numerous organizations.

Mallett's performance in 2009 led to higher expectations in 2010. The junior stated that he wished to change the mindset of Arkansas fans into that of a winning program. The confident Mallett was quoted saying, "I'm looking for 14," when asked about how many wins the 2010 Razorbacks could achieve.

On September 4, 2010, in a 44–3 victory over Tennessee Tech, Mallett completed 21-of-24 passes (87.5%), setting an Arkansas school record for completion percentage in a game. The completion percentage also ranks second all-time in SEC football history. Mallett contributed 301 passing yards, as well, with a total of 8 receivers recording catches. In the next game against Louisiana–Monroe, he finished with 400 passing yards, three touchdowns, and one interception. In the next game, against Georgia, he had his third consecutive game with three touchdown passes in the conference victory. Arkansas played Alabama in the next game and suffered their first setback of the season as Mallett had 357 passing yards, one touchdown, and three interceptions. The Razorbacks bounced back in the next game against Texas A&M as Mallett had 310 passing yards, three touchdowns, and one interception. After a loss to Auburn and a victory over Ole Miss, Mallett had 409 passing yards and three touchdowns in a victory over Vanderbilt. After a win over South Carolina, he had 215 passing yards and five touchdowns in a win over UTEP. After closing out the season with victories over Mississippi State and LSU, the Razorbacks faced off against Ohio State in the Sugar Bowl. In his final collegiate game, Mallett had 277 passing yards, two touchdowns, and one interception as the Razorbacks fell 31–26.

Mallett finished seventh in voting for the 2010 Heisman Trophy award.

On January 6, 2011, Mallett decided to forgo his senior year at Arkansas and declare for the 2011 NFL Draft where he was drafted in the 3rd round after sliding out of the first day's picks.

Collegiate awards
2010 Premier Player of College Football Trophy Winner
2009 and 2010 All-SEC second team
Autozone Liberty Bowl Offensive MVP
SEC Offensive Player of the Week (vs. South Carolina, Mississippi State, and Vanderbilt)

Statistics

Professional career

New England Patriots

2011 season
Mallett, who was often projected prior to the draft as a first-round talent, fell to the third round of the 2011 NFL Draft, where he was selected 74th overall by the New England Patriots (using the pick they received when they traded Randy Moss to the Minnesota Vikings); that pick was the highest pick the Patriots had used on a quarterback since taking Drew Bledsoe number one overall in 1993, until they drafted Jimmy Garoppolo in the second round of the 2014 NFL Draft 62nd overall.  According to Michael Lombardi of the NFL Network, the Patriots rated Mallett as the best quarterback available in the 2011 draft; nevertheless, six other quarterbacks were taken before the Patriots drafted him, drawing comparisons to Tom Brady, who was the seventh quarterback chosen in 2000, though with the 199th pick.

Mallett made his preseason debut in the Patriots' first preseason game, a 47–12 rout of the Jacksonville Jaguars on August 11. He played the entire second half, completing 12 of 19 passes for 164 yards, one touchdown, and no interceptions. The Patriots scored touchdowns on each of the first four drives Mallett led, and ran out the clock on his fifth and final drive. Mallett struggled in his next preseason games throwing an interception which was returned for a touchdown in his second game.  At his fourth preseason game against the Giants he was 6 for 16 for 57 yards.  Mallett spent 2011 as the Patriots' third-string QB, behind Tom Brady and Brian Hoyer. Mallett was inactive for 15 out of 16 regular season games and was inactive for every post season game for the Patriots' Super Bowl run.

2012 season
Following the Patriots' decision to release incumbent back-up quarterback Brian Hoyer prior to the season, Mallett was promoted to second-string signal caller behind Tom Brady. Mallett dressed in each of the first eight games of the season, and in their blowout 45–7 rout over the St. Louis Rams in London on October 28, 2012, Mallett took his first snaps in the NFL, completing 1/3 passes for 17 yards (his one completion to Shane Vereen) and a passer rating of 53.5. In the Patriots' blowout victory against the Houston Texans in December 2012, Mallett came into the game late in the fourth quarter and threw his first interception in the NFL on a pass deflected by intended receiver Visanthe Shiancoe.

2013 season
Mallett was listed as the #2 quarterback on the Patriots' depth chart behind Tom Brady and ahead of third-string quarterback Tim Tebow; Tebow would later be released by the Patriots, leaving Mallett as the Patriots' only backup quarterback.

Houston Texans

2014 season
On August 31, 2014 Mallett was traded to the Houston Texans for a conditional sixth-round pick. He would be the Texans' primary backup until November 5, 2014, when he was named the starting quarterback for the Texans by head coach Bill O'Brien, replacing Ryan Fitzpatrick, who was moved down one slot to 2nd on the depth chart.

During Week 11 of the 2014 season, Mallett started his first game, against the Cleveland Browns where he threw his first touchdown pass to J. J. Watt. He went 20 of 30 with two passing touchdowns and a 95.3 passer rating in the 23–7 win over the Browns. On November 23, Mallett tore his pectoral muscle against the Cincinnati Bengals, ending his season.

2015 season
Mallett returned in 2015, battling for the starting quarterback position against former teammate Brian Hoyer. He ended up losing the competition to Hoyer. The day after the announcement, Mallett missed the following day's practice, leading some to believe he disagreed with the decision. Mallett apologized and told head coach Bill O'Brien that he missed practice due to oversleeping.

Mallett replaced Hoyer in the fourth quarter against the Kansas City Chiefs in Week 1. Head coach Bill O'Brien announced afterward that Mallett would replace Hoyer as the starting quarterback. In Week 2, he completed 27 of his 58 passes for 244 yards, one touchdown and one interception, and a rushing touchdown in a 24–17 loss to the Carolina Panthers.

In Week 4 against the Atlanta Falcons, Mallett was benched for Hoyer with the Texans trailing 42–0, and Hoyer would lead the team to 21 points in a 48–21 loss. Despite Hoyer's success in the game, Mallett was named the starter for Week 5 against the Indianapolis Colts. During the Colts game, Mallett was hit hard, forcing him to leave for a play. Mallett appeared able and willing to return but was replaced by Hoyer for the remainder of the game. Hoyer threw for two touchdowns but also threw a costly interception to give the Colts a 27–20 victory. Before the Texans' game against the Dolphins on October 25, Mallett missed the team flight and was forced to fly commercial to join the team in Miami. Two days later, the Texans officially released him.

Baltimore Ravens 

On December 15, 2015, in the wake of Baltimore Ravens quarterback Matt Schaub suffering an injury following Joe Flacco's own season-ending injury, Mallett signed with the Ravens. On December 27, 2015, Mallett threw for a career-high 274 yards, leading the Ravens to a 20–17 upset victory over the Pittsburgh Steelers in his seventh career start, after Jimmy Clausen was benched. He would promptly get a new career high the following week with 292 passing yards in the Ravens' 24–16 loss to the Cincinnati Bengals.

Following Schaub returning to the Atlanta Falcons to be Matt Ryan's backup and Clausen retiring from the NFL, Mallett became Flacco's primary backup in 2016, appearing in four games. He completed three of his six passes and also threw an interception.

On March 9, 2017, Mallett signed a one-year contract extension with the Ravens. After Flacco suffered a concussion late in the second quarter of the Week 8 game against the Miami Dolphins, Mallet entered the game and completed three of seven passes for 20 yards and one touchdown as the Ravens won by a score of 40–0.

Post-NFL career
Mallett worked out for the Washington Redskins on December 4, 2018, but was not signed. He worked out for the XFL in Tampa Bay, Florida, on June 29, 2019. After a car accident, Mallett  was arrested for suspicion of driving while intoxicated in Arkansas on September 10, 2019. On April 16, 2020, Mallet was announced as an assistant coach at Mountain Home High School in Mountain Home, Arkansas. In 2022, he became the head football coach at White Hall High School in White Hall, Arkansas.

NFL career statistics

References

External links

1988 births
Living people
American football quarterbacks
Arkansas Razorbacks football players
Michigan Wolverines football players
New England Patriots players
Houston Texans players
Baltimore Ravens players
People from Batesville, Arkansas
People from Texarkana, Texas
Players of American football from Texas